The 2022–23 Northern Counties East Football League season will be the 41st in the history of the Northern Counties East Football League, a football competition in England.

The allocations for the league this season were announced by The Football Association (The FA) on 12 May 2022.

Premier Division

The Premier Division consists of 20 clubs.

The following five teams left the division at the end of the 2021-22 season:
Athersley Recreation - relegated to NCEL Division One
Grimsby Borough - promoted to Northern Premier League Division One East
AFC Mansfield - transferred to United Counties League Premier Division North
Sherwood Colliery - transferred to United Counties League Premier Division North
Staveley Miners Welfare - relegated to NCEL Division One

The following five teams joined the division ahead of the 2022-23 season:
Frickley Athletic - relegated from Northern Premier League Division One East
Golcar United - promoted from North West Counties League Division One North
Hallam - promoted from Northern Counties East League Division One
North Ferriby - promoted from NCEL Division One
Yorkshire Amateur - relegated from Northern Premier League Division One East

Premier Division table

Stadia and locations

Division One

Division One consists of 20 clubs.

The following seven clubs left Division One before the season:
 Clipstone - transferred to United Counties League Division One North
 FC Humber United – withdrew
 Hallam - promoted to Northern Counties East League Premier Division
 Hall Road Rangers - demoted to Humber Premier League
 North Ferriby - promoted to Northern Counties East League Premier Division
 Rainworth Miners Welfare - transferred to United Counties League Division One
 Teversal - relegated to Central Midlands League

The following six clubs joined Division One before the season:
Athersley Recreation - relegated from NCEL Division One
Beverley Town - promoted from Humber Premier League
Campion – transferred from North West Counties League Division One North
Horbury Town - promoted from West Yorkshire Association League
Staveley Miners Welfare - relegated from NCEL Division One
Wakefield - promoted from Sheffield & Hallamshire County Senior League Premier Division

Division One table

Stadia and locations

League Cup

The 2022–23 Northern Counties East Football League League Cup is the 41st season of the league cup competition of the Northern Counties East Football League.

References

External links
 Northern Counties East Football League

2022–23
9